Waldemar Prusik (born 27 July 1961, in Wroclaw) is a retired Polish footballer who played as a midfielder.

Honours

 1986–87 Polish Cup

External links
 
 

1961 births
Living people
Polish footballers
Association football midfielders
Śląsk Wrocław players
Alemannia Aachen players
K.R.C. Mechelen players
Poland international footballers
Sportspeople from Wrocław